The 2014 USC Trojans football team represented the University of Southern California in the 2014 college football season. USC played their home games at the Los Angeles Memorial Coliseum and were members of the South Division of the Pac-12 Conference. They were led by Steve Sarkisian, who returned to USC after coaching Pac-12 opponent Washington for five years. They finished the season 9–4, 6–3 in Pac-12 play to finish in a three-way tie for second place in the South Division. They were invited to the Holiday Bowl where they defeated Nebraska.

Personnel

Coaching staff

Roster

Returning starters
USC returns 16 starters in 2014, including eight on offense, eight on defense, and the starting kicker, punter & long snapper.

Key departures include Kevin Graf (OT), Marqise Lee (WR), Silas Redd (RB), Xavier Grimble (TE), Marcus Martin (C), George Uko (DE / DT), Devon Kennard (DE), Morgan Breslin (LB), Dion Bailey (LB / S), and Demetrius Wright (S)

Offense (8)

Defense (8)

Special teams (3)

 : Co-Starter in 2013

Depth chart

Rookies : *

Double Position : #

Recruiting class

2014 NFL Draft

Schedule

Game summaries

Fresno State

Stanford

Boston College

Oregon State

Arizona State

Arizona

Colorado

    
    
    
    
    
    
    
    
    
    
    
    

Cody Kessler 19/26, 319 Yds, 7 TD (school record)

Utah

Washington State

California

UCLA

Notre Dame

    
    
    
    
    
    
    
    
    

Cody Kessler 32/40, 372 Yds, 6 TD

Holiday Bowl

Rankings

Notes
 December 27, 2014 – After winning the Holiday Bowl game, Cody Kessler announced he will return next season for his senior year.

References 

USC
USC Trojans football seasons
Holiday Bowl champion seasons
USC Trojans football